Rosie Curston's Meadow is a  biological Site of Special Scientific Interest in Mattishall in Norfolk.

This unimproved calcareous clay meadow is managed by cattle grazing. It has over sixty grass species and a rich variety of herbs, including green-winged orchid, adder's tongue, bee orchid, twayblade and yellow rattle.

The site is private land with no public access.

References

Sites of Special Scientific Interest in Norfolk